Kowalewice may refer to the following places in Poland:
Kowalewice, Pomeranian Voivodeship (north Poland)
Kowalewice, Łódź Voivodeship (central Poland)
Kowalewice, West Pomeranian Voivodeship (north-west Poland)